The following is a list of football clubs in Israel by their league and division as of the 2015–16 season.
The Israeli football league system, which is run by the Israel Football Association (IFA), includes five levels which contain a total of 16 divisions, There are a total of 234 member clubs.

Premier League clubs (2015-16) 
:

 Beitar Jerusalem
 Bnei Sakhnin
 Bnei Yehuda
 Hapoel Acre
 Hapoel Be'er Sheva
 Hapoel Haifa
 Hapoel Kfar Saba
 Hapoel Ra'anana
 Hapoel Tel Aviv
 Ironi Kiryat Shmona
 Maccabi Haifa
 Maccabi Netanya
 Maccabi Petah Tikva 
 Maccabi Tel Aviv

Liga Leumit clubs (2015-16)
:

 Beitar Tel Aviv Bat Yam
 F.C. Ashdod
 Hapoel Afula
 Hapoel Ashkelon
 Hapoel Bnei Lod
 Hapoel Jerusalem
 Hapoel Nazareth Illit
 Hapoel Petah Tikva
 Hapoel Ramat Gan
 Hapoel Ramat HaSharon
 Hapoel Rishon LeZion
 Maccabi Ahi Nazareth
 Maccabi Herzliya
 Maccabi Kiryat Gat
 Maccabi Yavne

Liga Alef clubs (2015–16)

Liga Alef North
F.C. Karmiel Safed
Hapoel Asi Gilboa
Hapoel Beit She'an
Hapoel Hadera
Hapoel Herzliya
Hapoel Iksal
Hapoel Ironi Baqa al-Gharbiyye
Hapoel Kafr Kanna
Hapoel Migdal HaEmek
Ihud Bnei Majd al-Krum
Ironi Nesher
Ironi Tiberias
Maccabi Daliyat al-Karmel
Maccabi Ironi Kiryat Ata
Maccabi Sektzia Ma'alot-Tarshiha
Maccabi Tzur Shalom

Liga Alef South
Beitar Kfar Saba
Bnei Eilat
F.C. Kafr Qasim
F.C. Shikun HaMizrah
Hakoah Amidar Ramat Gan
Hapoel Azor
Hapoel Bik'at HaYarden
Hapoel Hod HaSharon
Hapoel Kfar Shalem
Hapoel Mahane Yehuda
Hapoel Marmorek
Hapoel Morasha Ramat HaSharon
Maccabi Amishav Petah Tikva
Maccabi Jaffa Kabilio
Maccabi Sha'arayim
Sektzia Nes Tziona

Liga Bet clubs (2015–16)

Liga Bet North A
Ahi Acre
Ahi Bir al-Maksur
Ahva Kafr Manda
Al-Nahda Nazareth
Beitar Haifa
Beitar Kafr Kanna
Beitar Nahariya
F.C. Tzeirei Kafr Kanna
Hapoel Bnei Maghar
Hapoel Bu'eine
Hapoel Ihud Bnei Sumei
Hapoel Kaukab
Hapoel Shefa-'Amr
Ironi Bnei Kabul
Maccabi Bnei Nahf
Maccabi Ironi Acre

Liga Bet North B
F.C. Daburiyya
F.C. Haifa Robi Shapira
F.C. Pardes Hanna-Karkur
F.C. Tzeirei Tur'an
Hapoel Bnei Zalafa
Hapoel Daliyat al-Karmel
Hapoel Ramot Menashe Megiddo
Hapoel Sandala Gilboa
Hapoel Umm al-Fahm
Ihud Bnei Baqa
Ihud Bnei Kafr Qara
Maccabi Ahi Iksal
Maccabi Ein Mahil
Maccabi Ironi Yafa
Maccabi Sulam
Maccabi Umm al-Fahm

Liga Bet South A
Agudat Sport Holon
Beitar Petah Tikva
Beitar Ramat Gan
F.C. Bnei Jaffa Ortodoxim
F.C. Ironi Or Yehuda
F.C. Roei Heshbon Tel Aviv
F.C. Tira
F.C. Tzeirei Tayibe
Hapoel Kafr Qasim Shouaa
Hapoel Kiryat Ono
Hapoel Nahlat Yehuda
Hapoel Pardesiya
Hapoel Ramat Yisrael
Hapoel Tzafririm Holon
Ironi Beit Dagan
Maccabi Ironi Kfar Yona

Liga Bet South B
Beitar Giv'at Ze'ev
Beitar Ironi Ma'ale Adumim
Beitar Yavne
Bnei Yeechalal Rehovot
F.C. Be'er Sheva
F.C. Dimona
F.C. Holon Yaniv
Hapoel Merhavim
Hapoel Rahat
Ironi Beit Shemesh
Ironi Modi'in
Maccabi Be'er Sheva
Maccabi Ironi Netivot
Maccabi Kiryat Malakhi
Maccabi Segev Shalom
Tzeirei Rahat

Liga Gimel clubs (2015–16)

Liga Gimel Upper Galilee
Bnei Ma'alot Tarshiha
F.C. Aramshe Danun
F.C. Bnei M.M.B.E. HaGolan VeHaGalil
F.C. Hatzor HaGlilit
F.C. Julis
Hapoel Bnei Bi'ina
Hapoel Bnei Hurfeish
Hapoel Bnei Peki'in
Hapoel Bnei Rameh
Hapoel Jat Yanuh HaGlilit
Hapoel Merom HaGalil
Hapoel Nahariya
Hapoel Tarshiha
Maccabi Ahva Yarka

Liga Gimel Lower Galilee
Ahva Arraba
F.C. Bnei Arraba
F.C. Halat al-Sharif
F.C. Tzeirei Ibtin Khawaled
F.C. Tzeirei Tamra 
Hapoel Bnei Deir al-Asad
Hapoel Bnei Nujidat
Hapoel Ironi Bni I'billin
Ironi Bnei Sha'ab
Maccabi Basmat Tab'un
Maccabi Bnei Deir Hanna
Maccabi Kafr Manda
Maccabi Ironi Tamra
Maccabi Tzeirei Shefa-'Amr

Liga Gimel Jezreel
Beitar Afula
Beitar al-Amal Nazareth
Beitar Ein Mahil
Beitar Umm al-Fahm
Bnei Musheirifa Baiada
F.C. Kfar Kama
F.C. Nazareth Illit
Hapoel al-Ittihad Nazareth
Hapoel Bnei Ar'ara 'Ara
Hapoel Bnei Fureidis
Hapoel Bnei Musmus
Hapoel Isfiya
Maccabi Ahi Ar'ara 'Ara

Liga Gimel Samaria
Beitar Hadera
Beitar Pardes Hanna
F.C. Hapoel Kiryat Yam
Hapoel Ahva Haifa
Hapoel Bnei Jisr az-Zarqa
Hapoel Ein as-Sahala
Hapoel Halissa
Hapoel Ironi Or Akiva
Hapoel Tirat HaCarmel
Maccabi Neve Sha'anan Eldad
Maccabi Ironi Barta'a
Maccabi Ironi Tirat HaCarmel
Maccabi Isfiya

Liga Gimel Sharon
Beitar Tubruk
Hapoel Ihud Bnei Jatt
Hapoel Jaljulia
Hapoel Kafr Bara
Hapoel Oranit
F.C. Bnei Qalansawe
F.C. Bnei Ra'anana
F.C. Ironi Ariel
F.C. Kafr Qasim Nibrass
F.C. Netanya
Maccabi HaSharon Netanya
Shimshon Bnei Tayibe
Shimshon Kafr Qasim

Liga Gimel Tel Aviv
Beitar Ezra
Beitar Jaffa Zion
Bnei Yehud
Elitzur Jaffa Tel Aviv
Elitzur Yehud Yotel
Hapoel Kiryat Shalom
Hapoel Neve Golan
Maccabi Hashikma Hen
Maccabi Ironi Or Yehuda
Maccabi Pardes Katz
Maccabi Spartak Ramat Gan
Otzma F.C. Holon
Shikun Vatikim Ramat Gan
Shimshon Tel Aviv

Liga Gimel Central
A.S. Nordia Jerusalem
F.C. Rishon LeZion
F.C. Tzeirei Lod
Hapoel Abirei Bat Yam
Hapoel F.C. Hevel Modi'in
Hapoel Ironi Gedera
Hapoel Matzliah
Hapoel Mevaseret Zion
Hapoel Ramla
Hapoel Tirat Shalom
Ironi Lod
Maccabi Kiryat Ekron

Liga Gimel South
A.S. Ashdod
A.S. Ashkelon
Bnei al-Salam Rahat
Elitzur Ironi Yehuda
F.C. Arad
F.C. Be'er Sheva Haim Levy
F.C. Hapoel Bnei Ashdod
F.C. Hapoel Yeruham
F.C. Ironi Kuseife
F.C. Maccabi Ashdod
F.C. Tzeirei al-Hoshla
Hapoel Tzeirei al-Mahdi
Maccabi Dimona
Maccabi Ironi Hura
Maccabi Ironi Sderot

External links
Israel Football Association 

 
Israel
clubs
Football clubs